Jakarta International Java Jazz Festival (JJF) is one of the largest jazz festivals in the world and arguably the biggest in the Southern Hemisphere, held in Jakarta, Indonesia. The annual jazz festival is held every early March and was designed to be one of the largest jazz festivals globally. It was held for the first time in 2005, when approximately 125 groups and 1,405 artists performed in 146 shows. The first festival was attended by 47,500 visitors during its three-day stretch. The festival, which is also known simply as Java Jazz, was founded by Indonesian businessman Peter F. Gontha.

Editions

2005
Date: March 5–7, 2005
Venue: Jakarta Convention Center, Senayan
Theme: "Bringing the World to Indonesia"
Number of visitors: ± 35.000
Number of stages: 11

International artists lineup

Amp Fiddler
Angie Stone
Chiara Civello
Deodato 
DJ IZO
DJ Maestro 
Eric Benet
Galaxy Jazz Big Band (Japan)
Gilles Peterson
Jeff Kashiwa
Jeff Lorber
Laura Fygi
Lizz Wright
Michael Paulo
Michelle Nicolle
Saskia Laroo
Steve Reid
Tania Maria
Tetsuo Sakurai
Tiempo Libre
Vinny Valentino

Special show
Earth, Wind & Fire Experience (featuring Al McKay's L.A. All Stars)
George Duke
Incognito
James Brown

Indonesian artists lineup

Adjierao & Jendela Ide Kids Percussion
Aksan Sjuman Quartet
Andien
Bali Lounge & Gita Wiryawan
Bayu Wirawan Trio
Bertha & Friends
Bintang Indrianto & Sujiwo Tejo
Bubi Chen
Canizzaro feat. Mus Mujiono
Cherokee
Chlorophyll
CO-P
D'Band
DJ Glenn
Donny Suhendra
Dwanka Band
Elfa's Bossa's
Elfa's Children Choir
Elfa's Jazz & Pop
Farabi Percussion Ensemble
Funky Thumb
Trisum (featuring Dewa Budjana, Tohpati, I Wayan Balawan)
Glenn Fredly
Heaven on Earth
Humania
Iga Mawarni
Indra Lesmana Reborn
Janapria/ Sanjaya/ Sjuman
Jaque Mate
Jazzyphonic
Krakatau
KSP
Kul-Kul
Ligro Trio
Maliq & D'Essentials
Marcell
Margie Segers feat. Idang Rasjidi & Friends
Maulana Brothers feat. Jackie
Melting Pod Soundsystem
Nera
New Breeze
No Name
Otti Jamalus Quartet
Padi
Paragita UI Choir
Pentatones feat. Benny Likumahuwa
Rieka Roeslan
Ruth Sahanaya
Saharadja feat. Rio & Sally
Salta
Shakila
Simak Dialog
Sova
Stereo Soul 
Sue & Friends
Syaharani & The Queenfireworks (ESQI:EF)
T-Five
Tamam Hoesein & Friends with Nina Warna
Ten 2 Five
The Groove
The Romero's
TJNDD International Quartet
Zefa

2006
Date: March 4–6, 2006
Venue: Jakarta Convention Center, Senayan
Theme: "Bringing the World to Indonesia"
Number of visitors: ± 40.000
Number of stages: ?

International artists lineup

Ad Colen Quartet
Adani & Wolf Group
Asianergy feat. Jack Lee
Bob James
Bob James and Angels of Shanghai
Bob James Quintet
Chiara Civello
Dave McMurray
Daniel Martina
Daniel Sahuleka
Daniela Schachter
Dave Koz and Vinny Valentino (feat. Indonesian Idol)
Dave Koz and Rendezvous All Stars feat. Jonathan Butler
Dennis Rollins Badbone & Co
Doug Cameron & Friends
Eric Benet
Gerald Albright
Harri Stojka
Hiromi
Incognito
Jack Lee
Jeff Lorber and Gerald Albright
Kirk Whalum
Lewis Pragasam
Lee Ritenour
Luis Giraldo
Mark de Clive-Lowe
Masada
Mezzoforte
Michael Lington & Magenta Orchestra (feat Jeff Lorber and Eric Benet)
Michael Paulo
Negroni's Trio
Nathan East
Noryn Aziz
Peter White & Michael Paolo Band
Raphael Gualazzi Trio
Relax
Rendezvous All Star feat Jonathan Butler
Wayman Tisdale
Rick Braun
Tetsuo Sakurai
Tortured Soul
Tots Tolentino
Vikter Duplaix
Vinny Valentino
Youn Sun Nah

Special show
Brand New Heavies
Patti Austin (feat. Twilite Orchestra)
Tower of Power
Take 6
Omar and Carleen Anderson (feat. Incognito)
Kool & the Gang

Indonesian artists lineup

4 Peniti
Adjierao Percussion Ensemble
Aksan Sjuman Quartet
Anda Bunga
Andi Wiriantono
Ape on the Roof
Balawan & Batuan Ethnic
Bali Lounge
Bandung All Stars - Imam Pras, Benny Likumahua & Jazz Connection
Benny Mustapha (Battle of the Drums)
Blue Savana
Blues Brothers Experience "Time Warp"
Bobb Quartet
British International School
Bubi Chen with Bob Tutupoly (special guest)
CDB
Cronik (turntablist)
Deviana
Discus feat. Fadly (Padi) & Andien
Doddie Latuharhary & Edy Timisela
Dwiki Dharmawan Project feat. Rafly
Ecoutez
Elfa Secioria feat. E Voices
Elfa Secioria feat. Elfa's Singer & Elfa's bosas
Ello
Endah Widiastuti & 426 UPH Bigband
Farabi Percussion Ensemble
Gadiz & Bass
Galaxy Jazz Big Band - (Japan)
Gilang Ramadhan feat. Nera
Glenn Fredly
Guitar Extravaganza (Kiboud M, Lee R, Vinny V, Jack Lee, Balawan, Dion, Nanda)
Harvey Malaihollo & Shakila feat. Magenta Lounge
Hyper Sax & CO
Idang Rasjidi & Syndicate
Imam Pras Quartet
Indonesian Idol (Mike, Yudika, Monita, Nania, Lucky)
Indonesian Soul feat. Humania special guests Marcell, Glenn & Andien
Indra Lesmana Reborn Guest Star Lenny Castro
Gerald Albright
Ireng Maulana & Friends
Jakarta International School
Japoz (Arief Setiadi & Joel)
Jaque Mate
Kahitna
Kelasik
Kiboud Maulana Blues Band
Kilimanjarao
Kirana Big Band
Ligro Trio
Luluk Purwanto Quartet
Maliq & D'Essentials
Marcell
Margie Segers
Maya Hasan & Soul Mate
Mocca
Moluccan Nite: Glen Fredly, Ruth Sahanaya, Harvey Malaiholo, Shakila, Mike etc.
Nial Djuliarso
Nina Tamam And Friends feat. Tamam Hoesein Band
Oele Patiselano, a tribute to Perry Pattiselano
OpusTre directed by Ricky Lionardi
Otti Jamalus
Park Drive
Quita
Rafi Drums
Rieke Roeslan
Rio Moreno Trio
Ruth Sahanaya feat. Ad Colen Quartet
Saharadja
Shakila
Shanou
Simak Dialog
SORE
Sova
Tangga
The Forte Band: A tribute night to Bill Saragih
TIKA
Tomorrow People Ensemble
Tompi feat. Groovology
Tribute to John Pattirane feat. Opustre Big Band, Bob Tutupoly, Ruth Sahanaya, Andre Hehanusa, Shakilla, Margie Segers, Harvey Malaiholo, Lita Zen, Olive, Iwan Zen, Edo Kondologit, MD:Ricky Lionardi, Glenn
Tuti & Friends (Jogja)
Viky Sianipar
White Shoes & Couples Company
Wong Pitoe
Yeppi Romero & Andi Bayou
Zarro
Zefa (11th) & uncles

2007
Date: March 2–4, 2007
Venue: Jakarta Convention Center, Senayan
Theme: "Bringing the World Together"
Number of visitors: ± 40.000
Number of stages: 15

International artists lineup

5-Essence feat. John Hondorp
Adam Klipple
Airto Moreira & Flora Purim
Austin Peralta
Black Diamonds
Bobby Hutcherson
Brian Simpson
Daughters of Soul feat. Lalah Hathaway
Dave Douglas
Indira Khan
Dave Weckl
David Benoit
Deniece Williams
Diane Schuur
Djanecy
Eldar
Eric Legnini Trio
Eric Marienthal
Frank McComb
Freddie Washington
Gino Vannelli
Harvey Mason
The Hipstones
Jan Wessels
Jeff Lorber
Jeffrey Osborne
John Scofield
Jorge Diaz
Kenny Rankin
Kiki Ebsen
Kimiko Itoh
Koji Goto
Kyle Eastwood
Larry Franco
Level 42
Lica Cecato
Lisa Ono
Marcus Miller
Maurice Rugebregt "Sioh Maluku"
Michael Paulo
Nona Hendryx
Omar Sosa
Reel People
Richard Bona
Rick Braun
Ron Carter
Sadao Watanabe
Sam McNally
SFJAZZ Collective ft. *Joshua Redman
Shapes
Steve Thornton
Tony Monaco
Tortured Soul
Vikter Duplaix
Yosuke Onuma

Special show
Chaka Khan
Jamie Cullum
Sérgio Mendes

Indonesian artists lineup

"Brothers Of Revolution" feat Indra Lesmana
Humania
Glen Fredly
Mike 
Mc Vandal
Acoustic Encounter feat:Ireng & Kiboud Maulana, Kadek, Nanda, Viktor R, Oele P, Adjierao 
Unlimited Percussion
Aldrin 
Andi Wiriantono 
Arief Setiadi & Friend's 
Bad Boys Blues
Balawan Trio 
Bambang Nugroho
Barry Likumahuwa Project 
BazzAttack 
Beben Jazz feat. Carolina 
Benny Likumahuwa & The Young Connection 
Benny Mustafa and Young All Stars 
Bobb Quartet
Bubi Chen
Canzo
Chill n' Play 
Cindy 
Devian 
Dian PP
Special Project 
DJ Ebi
DJ Glenn 
Dwiki Dharmawan World Peace Project 
Ecoutez 
Elfa's Singers, Elfa's Bossas with Elfa's Big Band 
Emerald 
Endah & Rheza
g.d.e 
Galaxi Big Band
Geliga
Glen Dauna Jazz Quintet
Harry Toledo
HyperSax N Co feat. Saunine
Idang Rasjidi & The Syndicate 
Iga Mawarni & Heaven on Earth 
Imam Fathur
Indonesian Voice of Soul (Ello, Rio F, Mike, Lucky, Pasto) 
Indra Aziz 
Ivonne Atmodjo 
Jazzy Phonic
Jakarta Drums School Rhythm Nation
Jilly And Her Banda Brama
Jopie Item & Friends Feat. Rien Djamain
Trie Utami
Kelasik
Kirana Big Band Jogjakarta
Krakatau
The Journey Of.M.Director:Irvan Chasmala feat. Andien
Olive
Rieka Roslan
Ruth Sahanaya
Loopin Loop
Maliq & D'Essentials
Marcel
Melly
Michelle Efferin Quartet
Moskvitch
Oele Pattiselano Project feat. 3G
Park Drive
Pasto 
Pineapple 
Rieka Roslan 
Rien Djamain 
Ruth Sahanaya 
Ryan
Shanty 
Six Element 
Soul Id
Soul Vibe 
Starlite 
Syaharani 
Syaharani & Queen Fireworks 
The Journey Of Krakatau
The Professors
The S Scade PCBnB
Tiga Mawarnih
Titi DJ
Tompi & Groovology 
Viky Sianipar
Vivo
Warrior of Manga 
Zarro 
Zinnia
4 on 6 Quintet
Apple Program Application For Music feat. Riza Arshad
Dimi
EQ Humania Project 
Jaque Mate 
Kahitna 
Karimata
Tribute To Barry Likumahuwa feat. Andien, Cindy, Dira, Ello, Mike Mohede, Pasto
Rio Febrian 
Tya Subiakto Orchestra 
4 AM Quartet 
Ello
Erwin Gutawa
Jakarta Intl School Big Band
Kulkul
La Belle
Quicky 
Storytellers

2008
Date: March 7–9, 2008
Venue: Jakarta Convention Center, Senayan
Theme: "Taste the Spirit of Jazz"
Number of visitors: ± 45.000
Number of stages: 19

International artists lineup

Atilia
Attwenger
Brian Simpson
Chico & the Gypsies
Coda (Australia)
Crusaders (feat. Randy Crawford)
D'Sound
Dhafer Youssef
Duo - Gabriel Grossi e Daniel Santiago
Dwiki Dharmawan's 'World Peace Project' feat. Walfredo Reyes, Jr.
R. Burn
Tollak Ollestad
S. Thornton
Earth, Wind & Fire Experience (featuring Al McKay's L.A. All Stars)
Eric Darius
Everette Harp
Franco D'Andrea Quartet
Gary Anthony
George Clinton 'Funkadelic'
Greg Adams
Gregg Karukas
Harvey Mason
Incognito
Jammin Zeb
Jane Project
Jeff Kashiwa
Jeff Lorber
Jeff Lorber Band (feat. Eric Darius)
Jody Watley
Joe Sample & The Crusaders (feat. Steve Gadd)
Julien Wilson Trio
Katalyst (Australia)
Kazumi Watanabe
Kristin Berardi and The Band (feat. Mike Nock Trio)
Kurt Elling
Lee Ritenour (with Patrice Rushen, William Kennedy, Kurt Elling)
Lee Ritenour (with Patrice Rushen)
Lenny Castro
Logic
Marc Antoine
Marlene Del Rosario (Philippines)
Maysa Leak
Megan Bowman
Melvin Davis
Michael Paulo
Michiel Borstlap `Eldorado` (Netherlands)
Mike Nock Trio
Najee
Omar Sosa
Raul Midon
Ray Parker Jr.
Renee Olstead
Ron King Big Band
Sara Gazarek
Sizhukong (Taiwan)
Steve Oliver & Humberto Velas
Terumasa Hino
Tetsuo Sakurai
The Harvey Mason Trio (with Pat Martino & Tony Monaco)
The High Five Quintet (Italy)
Tineke Postma
Tony Monaco
Triba
West Coast All Stars (feat. Greg Adams, Jeff Kashiwa, Gregg Karukas)

Special show
James Ingram
Bobby Caldwell
Babyface
The Manhattan Transfer

Indonesian artists lineup

21st Night
4 Peniti (DB)
4AM Quartet
5 Wanita - Rieka Roeslan, Yuni Shara, Iga Mawarni, Nina Tamam, Andien  
Abdul 
Aditya 
Adrian Adioetomo (DB)
Afgan
Alfred Young Sugiri
Andezzz [departure:people]
Andy Gomez 
Ari (Groovology) 
Arti Dewi (DB) 
Asiabeat
Audy
Avenue 
Bad Boyz Blues 
Bali Lounge
Bambang Nugroho Octagon
Barry Likumahuwa 
Benny Likumahuwa & the Salamander Big Band 
Benny Mustafa van Diest 
Bibus
Bop Vivant
Canizzaro 
Canzo feat. Sherly O
Cindy Bernadette
Contra Indigo
Crave
Desty 
Devian 
Deviana 
Dewi Sandra
Dian Pramana Poetra 
Dimi
Ecoutez
Eki Puradiredja
Endah N Rhesa 
Ermy Kullit 
Fakta
Friends 
Galaxy Big Band
Gihon Lohanda Trio
Glen Dauna Project
Glenn Fredly
Gorga
Gugun & The Blues Bug
Hyper Sax, 
Idang Rasjidi
Imel Rosalin Trio
Ireng Maulana
ITMOS (Indonesia-Germany-US)
Iwan Wiradz & Tri Budiman feat. Elfa Secioria
J-Flow (DB)
Jakarta Broadway Singer & IMDI Ensemble
Jakarta Drums School
JassKiddin'
Jazz Perhaps & Flava
Jazzmatic
Jazzmint Big Band
Jeffrey Tahalele 
Jimmy
Jopie Item
Karinding Collaborative Project
Kinanti Project
Kirana Big Band 
La Belle 
Laconieck 
Lenggie
Ligro Trio
Michelle Effirin Quartet
Mike Mohede
Mr. Lazy
Nial Djuliarso
Nikki Manuputty 
Notturno
Oele Pattiselano
Oleo, Orbeat (DB) 
Palm From The Moody Tunes
Parkdrive 
Pasto 
Phinisi (Makasar)
Prambors Jazz Band
Pro Rejected
R&B Band
Radhini & Renita 
RAN
Rio Moreno 
Ryan
Saharadja
Santa Monica (DB) 
Sekapur Sirih
Shinta & Jubing 
Sister Duke 
Sketsa
Sol Project
Souleh & Soulehah
Soulvibe 
Starlite
Suddenly September 
Surabaya All Star
Syaharani and The Queenfireworks 
Tao Kombo 
The Cats
The Doctors
The New Konservativ 
Tiga Mawarnih 
Tika (DB)
Tiwi Shakuhachi 
Tri Sum
Two Triple O 
Vassagie
Velvet Band 
Whisper Not
Yance Manusama

2009
Date: March 6–8, 2009
Venue: Jakarta Convention Center, Senayan
Theme: "It's a Festival for All"
Number of visitors: ± 70.000
Number of stages: 19

International artists lineup

Alex Ligertwood
Antonio Pontarelli
Chuck Loeb
Dave Valentin
Dhruv
Dwight Sills
Eliane Elias
Eric Darius
Everette Harp
Gamelan Shockbreaker
Gary Anthony
Harvey Mason Quartet
Isao Suzuki
John Stoddart
Karizma (feat. David Garfield)
Ledisi
Mike Stern (feat. Dave Weckl)
Mitch Forman
Moon Arra (India)
New York Voices & Ron King Big Band
Oleta Adams
Parov Stelar (Austria)
Pascoal Meirelles
Peabo Bryson
Prasanna
Purple Circle
Quasimode (Japan)
Rex Rideout
Roy Ayers
Royce Campbell "Tribute To Wes Montgomery" (feat. Tonny Monaco, Oele Pattiselano & Cendy Luntungan)
Sensuàl
Simon Phillips
Soil & "Pimp" Sessions
Stefano Bollani
Steve Ferrone
Student Loan
The Gospel According to Jazz
Thermal and a Quarter
Toku
Tom Scott & Paulette McWilliams
Veronica Nunn

Special show
Brian McKnight
Dianne Reeves
Jason Mraz
Laura Fygi
Matt Bianco
Swing Out Sister

Indonesian artists lineup

21st Night
Abdul & The Coffee Theory feat. David Naif
Aditya
Afgan
Aksan Sjuman
Andy Gomez
Anggun
Ariss
Bambang Nugroho Stright Ahead
Benny Likumahuwa Jazz Connection & 5 Bones
Benny Mustafa Van Diest feat. Nial Djuliarso & Indro
Canizzaro
Cindy Bernadette
Contra Indigo
D'Cinnamons
Drew
Dwiki Dharmawan Global Harmony Orchestra
Ecoutez
Elfas Scecoria feat. Elfa's Singers
Emerald
Endah N Rhesa
Glenn Fredly Tribute to Chrisye
Humania
Jamie Aditya
Jazmint Big Band
Jflow
Joeniar Arief & Lala Suwages
Joppie Item & Friends
LALA
Malaka Ensemble feat. Hendry Lamiri Band
Maliq 'n D'Essentials feat. The Organic's All Stars
Manna
New Breeze
Nicky Manuputty
Nial Djuliarso
Noor Bersaudara
Oele Pattiselano
Orbeat Project
Pa Tua (Stefan Thiele)
Phinisi
Pitoelas Big Band
Ran
Riza Arsyad Proje Ct/ Simak Dialog
Salamander Big Band feat. Margie Segers
Sierra
Slank
Souleh & Souleha
Soulvibe
Surabaya All Star
Tohpati
Tompi
Tropical Transit
Toba Rumba feat. Yeppy Romero
Vidi Aldiano
Yance Manusama feat Funk Section

2010
Date: March 5–7, 2010
Venue: Jakarta International Expo, Kemayoran
Theme: "Jazzin' Up Remarkable Indonesia"
Number of visitors: ± 60.000
Number of stages: 22

International artists lineup

Adonis Puentes
Alexandra Sherling
Allen Hinds
Arturo O'Farrill
Bill Evans
Bob James
Breakestra
Brian Lynch "Unsung Heroes"
Brian Simpson
Chieli Minucci
Christian McBride and Inside Straight
Darryl Jones
David Murray Black Saint Quartet
Dedication (feat. Alexandra Sherling, Valeri Grohovski's Jazz Trio, Hermitage) 
Due Voci: (Diane Warren's Greatest Hits)
Direct from Las Vegas: The Rat Pack (with Ron King Big Band)
Dr. Roberto Aymes (Mexico)
Emilio Santiago
Eric Benet (with Ron King Big Band)
Griffith Frank
Harvey Mason
HDV Trio (with David Helbock)  (Austria)
Hendrik Meurkens Samba Jazz Quartet
Hubert Laws
Ivan Lins
Jane Monheit
Jazzanova Live! (feat. Paul Randolph)
Jessy J
Karen Briggs
Karsh Kale & MIDIval Punditz
Kurt Rosenwinkel Guitar Clinic
Lao Tizer
Lee Ritenour
Maurice "Mobetta" Brown
Melvin Davis
Michael Paulo
Mindi Abair
Nathan Haines
Novello B3
Randy Brecker
Robben Ford
Rodney Holmes
Ron Bruner Jr.
Ron King Big Band
Roy Hargrove Quintet
RTM Orchestra (Malaysia)
Rufus (feat. Sly Stone)
Sax Divas
The Sax Pack  (Jeff Kashiwa, Steve Cole, Kim Waters)
Sheila Majid
Soulbop: Special Edition
Special EFX
State of Monc
Steve Lukather
The Johnny Thompson Singers
Tony Monaco
Wet Floor

Special show
Babyface
John Legend
The Manhattan Transfer (with Ron King Big Band)
The Manhattan Transfer: The Chick Corea Songbook
Toni Braxton

Indonesian artists lineup

/rif Special Project feat. Toni Monaco, State of Monc Horn & DJ Cream
21st Night
Aditya feat. Aminoto K, Andi Rianto, Adrian, Kyriz
Anda with the Joints
Andezz
Andra & the backbone acoustic feat. Ari Lasso
Andre Harihandoyo & Sonic People
Andre Hehanusa
Angel Percussion
BAG Trio
Batak Sensation
Beatbop Jazz Project
Benny Mustafa Quartet feat. Indra Lesmana, Yance Manusama, Nikita Dompas
Chlorophyl
Coklat
Contra Indigo
Eclairs
Ecoutez
Endah 'n Rhesa
Gugun Blues Shelter
Idang Rasjidi Special Funk Project
Imela Kei
Indra Aryadi
Jakarta Broadway Singers
Jakarta Broadway Team
JavaJazz feat. Indra L., Gilang R., Matez, Donny S., Dewa Budjana
Lala Suwages
Leonardo
Major Seventh
Maya Hasan Sound of Light feat. Fariz RM, John P, Adi D, Sandy W, Iwan H, Michael
Notturno feat. Chroma String Quartet
Opustre Soul Big Band feat. Lea Simanjuntak
Papayafil
Quartet Punakawan feat. Jaya Suprana
Rafi & The Beat with Soul Generation feat. Soulmate, Rudlof, Davina, Bona Pascal, Radhini Aprilia
Sol Project
SUB 4
Surabaya All Star
Tika N The Dissidents
Titi Sjuman Folk Jazz Project
Tropical Transit (Bali)
Yeppy Romero & Harry Toledo
Yovie Widianto Fusion
Yuri Mahatma

2011
Date: March 4–6, 2011
Venue: Jakarta International Expo, Kemayoran
Theme: "Harmony Under One Nation in Remarkable Indonesia"
Number of visitors: ± 110.000
Number of stages: 18

International artists lineup

Abraham Laboriel
Acoustic Alchemy
Bauchklang
Bob James
Bobby Lyle
Brian Culbertson
Brian Simpson
Chuck Loeb
Corinne Bailey Rae
Daniel Amat
Danjil
Eastmania (feat. Kai Eckhardt)
Ed Motta
Eric Darius
Everette Harp and Bobby Lyle - Acoustic Show
Fareed Haque
Fourplay
George Duke All Stars
Harvey Mason
Hendrik Meurkens
Jamie Lidell
Jeff Lorber
Joey DeFrancesco Trio
Jose James
Juan de Marcos González & Afro Cuban All Stars
Kilimanjaro
Los Amigos
Luca Ciarla Quartet
Maurice "Mobetta" Brown
Michael Paulo
Nathan East
New York Voices
Rasmus Faber & RaFa Orchestra
Rhoda Scott
Robert Glasper Experiment
Roberta Gambarini
Ron King Big Band
Roy Hargrove Quintet
Ruben Hein
Sondre Lerche
Sr. Mandril
Steve Smith & Vital Information (feat. Vinny Valentino)
The Nairobi Trio (featuring Jonas Julio)
Tony Monaco
Zap Mama

Special show
George Benson
Santana

Indonesian artists lineup

Abdul and The Coffee Theory
Ade & Brothers
Aditya
Andien : The B-Sides
Barry Likumahuwa Project
Benny Likumahuwa & Young Jazz Connection
Benny Mustafa
Bonita & The Husband
Bubi Chen Plays Pop
C-Man
Calvin Jeremy
Chairul Umam Quintet
David Manuhutu
Dira Sugandi
Donny Suhendra
Drew
Dwiki Dharmawan & Angklung Jazz Ensemble
Elfa Secioria and His Legacy Lives On.. (feat. Elfa's Singers, Titi DJ, Elfa's Jazz Youth, Hedy Yunus, Yovie Widianto)
Ello
Endah N Rhesa
Syaharani & The Queenfireworks (ESQI:EF)
Fariz RM (feat. Barry Likumahuwa & Friend)
Erwin Gutawa Big Band
Farrah Di Bigband
Four On The Floor
Fraya
Gigi and Ron King Big Band
Glen Dauna (feat. Farrah Di)
Glenn Fredly
Husbands and Wives (Otti Jamalus, Yance Manusama & Endah N Rhesa)
Idang Rasjidi
Imam Pras Quartet
Indonesia NuProgressive - Tribute to Harry Roesli
Indonesian Youth Regeneration
Indra Aryadi
Indra Aziz Experiment
Indro Hardjodikoro
Iwan Abdie
Iwan Hasan & Andien
Enggar + Mery CHAMBER JAZZ
J.O.C feat. J.O.C. Voices & Iwan Wiraz
Java Jive
Jopie Item
Kahitna
Kirana Big Band
LLW (Indra Lesmana, Barry Likumahuwa, Sandy Winarta)
Maliq & D'Essentials
Manna Band
Marcell
Mian Tiara & D'Organics
Minangapentagong Sawahlunto
Nial Djuliarso: The Jazz Soul of Ismail Marzuki
Nikita Dompas & His Fellow Musicians
Nita Aartsen feat. Michael Paulo
Notturno feat. The Soundscape
Oele Pattiselano
Pandji Pragiwaksono
Pitoelas Bigband
Raisa
RAN
Sandhy Sondoro
Sandy Winarta Quartet
Shadow Puppet Quartet
Simak Dialog
Sketsa
Soulvibe
Spero
 The Groove
The Jongens Jazz Quartet
The Police Project by Margo Rising
The Profesors
Tohpati Bertiga.
Young Boys
Zarro

2012
Date: March 2–4, 2012
Venue: Jakarta International Expo, Kemayoran
Theme: "Where Jazz Finds a Home"
Number of visitors: ± 123.000
Number of stages: 18

International artists lineup

Barry White Show & The Pleasure Unlimited Orchestra
Bobby Caldwell
Bobby McFerrin
Brian Simpson
Bruce Hamada
Carl Allen
Chante Moore
Chris Standring
Dave Koz
David Garfield & friends (Freddie Washington, Walfredo Reyes, Jr., Alex Ligterwood ft. Gerald Albright)
David Sanborn
Depapepe
Dolf de Vries Trio (ft. Madeline Bell)
Duwende
D'Sound
Franck Amsallem
Frank McComb
Gary Anthony & Ron King Big Band
George Duke Trio
Gerald Albright
Hector Infanzon (Mexico)
Jeff Lorber
Jeff Pescatto
Joey DeFrancesco
Juilliard Jazz Quartet
Laura Fygi
Mamas Gun
Maurice "Mobetta" Brown
Mayer Hawthorne & The County
Medeski Martin & Wood
Nils Wogram Nostalgia
Phil Perry
Poncho Sanchez Latin Jazz Band
Quincy Jones presents : Alfredo Rodriguez Trio
Robert Randolph and the Family Band
Ron Carter
Ron King Big Band
Sheila E. presents The E Family
Soil and "Pimp" Sessions
Swing Out Sister
Taylor McFerrin
The Manhattan Transfer
Tony Monaco
Triba
Trijntje Oosterhuis
Yoshinobu Hara

Special show
Al Jarreau & George Duke Trio
Erykah Badu
Herbie Hancock
Pat Metheny
Stevie Wonder

Indonesian artists lineup

Abdul and the Coffee Theory
Aboda
Ade & Brothers
Andi Wiriantono Quartet & the Next Generation
Andi Wiriantono Quintet
Andien
Andre Harihandoyo and Sonic people
Ari Pramundito
Atmosfera
Balawan Bifan Duo
Bambang Nugroho Straight Ahead + Cindy Bernadette
Barry Likumahuwa Project feat. Ricky Lionardi Big band
Benny Likumahuwa Like Father Like Son
Benyamin on Jazz - Tribute to the Legend
Bob Tutupoly Tribute to Bing Slamet & Sam Saimun feat. Titiek Puspa & Grace Simon
Boby Limijaya 8 Horns Band
Calvin Jeremy
Chaseiro
Cindy Bernadette
Creamy Sugar Groove
Devian Band
Deviana und Freunde
Dewa Budjana
Dira Sugandi
Donny Koeswinarno Quartet
Donny Suhendra Project feat. Trie Utami
Drew
Dwiki Dharmawan & Sa'unine String Quartet
Emerald BEX
Endah & Rhesa
Fanny Kuncoro Organ Quartet
Farah Di
Four on the Floor
Funky Thumb feat. Najwa
G-Pluck Beatles Gallery
Galaxy Big Band
Glen Dauna Project
Godbless
Gugun Blues Shelter
Heaven on Earth
HIVI
Idang Rasjidi
Imela Kei
IMI Band
In Memoriam of Bubi Chen
Indonesia Nu Progressive
Indonesian Youth Regeneration
Indra Aziz Beat Bop Project
Indra Lesmana - LLW feat. Maurice Brown
Indrawan Tjhin Group
Indro Hardjodikoro - The Fingers
Jemima
JOC feat. Bale Jazz Community
Jopie Item Band with His Son
Jozz Felix
Kirana Big Band
KLA Project
Kosakata
Kotak feat. Nabrassban
KSP
Lala Karmela
Le Smokes Section's
Living Colors
Maliq & D'Essentials
Manna
Margo Rising Stars
Matthew Sayersz & Tohpati
Monita Tahalea Quartet
Music Clinic
Nicky Manuputty
Nino
Notturno
Oele Pattiselanno
Paquita
Phylosophy ABG
Project Bebas - Irianti & Friends
Radhini
Raisa
Rendezvous by Rieka Roslan
Rio Sidik Quintet
Sandy Canester
Sandy Winarta Quartet
Senar 3
Shadow Puppets feat. Nesia Ardi
Sierra Soetedjo
Simak Dialog
Sister Duke
Sketsa
Smart Reborn
Soulfull Corp
Soulvibe
Speakeasy
Sri Hanuraga Trio
Sruti Respati
Stereocase
Streamline Quartet
Sujiwo Tejo
Syaharani & QueenfireWorks
Tembang Pribumi
The Jongens Quartet
The Journalists
The Professors
The Urban Gentlemen
Tohpati Ethnomission
Tomorrow People Ensemble
Tribute to Herbie Hancock
Tribute To Utha Likumahuwa
Trio Lestari (Glen Fredly, Sandhy Sondoro, Tompi)
Trio Scapes
Trisum
Twilite Orchestra
Urban Phat
VNS
WRQ

2013
Date: March 1–3, 2013
Venue: Jakarta International Expo, Kemayoran
Theme: "Jazz Up the World"
Number of visitors: ± 115.000
Number of stages: 17

International artists lineup

Balance and The Traveling Sounds
Bob James
Brian Simpson
Butterscotch
Chucho Valdes
Chuck Loeb
David Helbock
Eldar Djangirov
Emily Elbert
Fernandez4
Fourplay
George Duke & Stanley Clarke
 Kaori Kobayashi
James Carter Organ Trio
Jimmy Cliff
Jose James
Magnus Lindgren (with Gregory Porter)
Marcus Miller
Mellow Motif
Miles Smiles (feat. Larry Coryell, Joey DeFrancesco, Omar Hakim, Daryll Jones, Rick Margitza)
New York Voices
Phil Perry
Roberta Gambarini
Roy Hargrove Quintet
Roy Hargrove RH Factor
Spyro Gyra
The Kenny Garrett Quintet
The Soul Rebels
Wouter Hamel

Special show
Basia
Joss Stone
Lisa Stansfield
Craig David

Indonesian artists lineup

4 Dekade - Oddie Agam & Friends with Twilite Orchestra
Abdul and The Coffee Theory
Aboda
Ade & Brothers
Aiko
Aimee Saras Goes Swing
Aksan Sjuman Glimpse
Amanda and Friends
Amboina
Andezzz
Andi Wiriantono & Friends
Andien
Anji
B.D.G
B3
Balawan Bifan Trio feat Didiet Violin
Bandanaira
Barry Likumahuwa Project (BLP) Tribute to Weather Report
Be3
Benny Likumahuwa Jazz Connection
Benny Mustafa feat. Rene Van Helsdigen
Bonita & The Husband
BubuGiri
Calvin Jeremy
Cindy Bernadette
D'Masiv Jazz Project
Dewa Budjana
Dewi Sandra
Donny Koeswinarno Quintet
Donny Suhendra Power-Fusion Trio
Dwiki Dharmawan and String Quartet
Edelweiss
Erik Sondhy Trio ( Karma)
Eva Celia
Flamenco Jazz Yeppy Romero & Nita Aartsen
For Better Life Movement 57kustik
G-Pluck Beatles
Galaxy Jazz Big Band
Ginda and The White Flowers
Glen Dauna - Jimmy Hendrix Experience
Glenn Fredly
HajarBleh Big Band
Heaven On Earth
Highnotes
Idang Rasjidi meets Oele Pattiselanno
IMI Band
Indonesia Youth Regeneration
Indra Lesmana-LLW feat Maurice Brown
Indro Hardjodikoro The Fingers feat. dr. Tompi
Ipang
Iwan Hasan & Andien, Enggar + Mery Chamber Jazz
Jhagad And Nusaha
Karim Suweileh & Jazzy Quintet
Kayon
Klasika Kompas Workshop
Krishna Balagita
Ligro Trio
Luka, Cinta & Merdeka - Glenn Fredly & Bakuucakar
Maliq & D'essentials "Sriwedari"
Manna
Margo Rising Stars
Matthew Sayersz
Maya Hasan Classic Goes Jazz
Mery Kasiman Project ft. Aksan Sjuman, Riza Arshad
Milkiway
Mr. Sonjaya
Next Project
Nino
Oele Pattiselanno Septet
Out Of Ordinary
PD Tracks
Philomena Singers
Rafly Wasaja
Raisa
RAN
Ritem Pertiwi
Sandy Winarta Quartet
Sarita Fraya
Shadow Puppets - Septet
Shadu Rasjidi
Shakila
Sister Duke
Soul Bridge
Soul Music System
Space System
Speakeasy
Storia
Suave
Suddenly September
Sweet Mouztache
Tembang Pribumi
The Collaboration
The Crickets
The ExtraLarge
The Groove feat. Monday Michiru
The Jongens Quartet
The Soul Makers
Three Song
Tjut Nyak Deviana Daudsjah feat. Dip'ah
Tohpati Bertiga
Tompi
Tribute To Elfa Secioria Feat Netta, Monita, Jemima, Yassovi
Tribute To Ismail Marzuki Feat. Ghea Idol & Dendy Mike's
Tribute To Utha Likumahuwa Feat Dinni Budiayu & Jamaica Cafe
Tulus
Ultras Quartet
VNS
Vriidom (Bale Jazz)
Yassovi

2014
Date: February 28–March 2, 2014
Venue: Jakarta International Expo, Kemayoran
Theme: "Bringing the World to Indonesia"

International artists lineup

Bella Kalolo
Bob James
Brazilian Connection
Brian Simpson
Chuck Loeb
Cristina Morrison
Dave Koz
Djavan
Dirty Loops
Dutch Indo All Stars
Earth, Wind & Fire Experience (featuring Al McKay's L.A. All Stars)
Everette Harp
Fourplay
Gerald Albright
Harvey Mason
India Arie
Incognito 
Ivan Lins
James Taylor Quartet
Jeff Lorber
Joe Lima
Joe Sabia
Jonathan Butler
Joyce
Keiko Matsui
Leny Andrade
Magnus Lindgren
Marcello Lessa
Masse Sant Anan
Maurice Brown
Michael McDonald
Mindi Abair
Natalie Cole
Nathan East
Nils Petter Molvær
Norman Brown
Richard Elliot
Rick Braun
Robert Glasper
Roberthino
Ron King Big Band
Sadao Watanabe
Schroeder-Headz
Snarky Puppy
Soren Bebe
Tania Maria
Timo Lassy
Toni Barretto
Tony Monaco
Vincent Ingala & Gregg Karukas

Special show
Allen Stone
Natalie Cole
Jamie Cullum
India Arie

Indonesian artists lineup

5 Wanita
Adhitia Sofyan
Afgan feat Vina Panduwinata
Agnez Mo
Andi Wiriantono Free Standarts Jazz Funk & Swing
Art Of Tree
Balawan
Be3
Benny Mustafa
Bintang Indrianto
Bubugiri
Darkbark Dimension
Devian and the Jazz Intersection
Dewa Budjana
Dian Pramana Poetra & Twilite Orchestra
Diops
Dira Sugandi feat Ron King Big Band
Donny Koeswinarno Quart Electric
Drew
Dwiki Dharmawan & Friends
Elfa's Bossas
Endah N Rhesa Extended
Esqi.EF
Farah di Band feat Lana Nitibaskara
Gadiz and Bazz
Galaxy Bigband
Gilang Ramadhan With Adi Darmawan & Ivan Nestorman
Glen Dauna Project:Chat With Toots Feat Indra Dauna & Rega Dauna ( Harmonica )
Gugun Blues Shelter
Idang Rasjidi United Kingdom Rhythm
Ina Ladies
Indro Hardjodikoro - The Fingers
Ivan Handojo
J.O.C - PFG
Jamie Aditya
Jazzmint
Jeffrey Tahalele
Joey Alexander Trio
Joy Tobing
Karim Suweileh & The Jazzy Quintet
Krystal Tahalele
Latasha
Like Father like Son Tribute to Indonesian Jazz Legends
Liwu Rayie
Maliq & D'Essentials
Manna Band
Marcell with Ricky Lionardi Bigband
Monita Tahalea
Musikimia
Nial Djuliarso
Oele Pattiselanno
P-Project Bigband
Radhini
Raisa
RAN
Rio Moreno Latin Combo
Robert MR Quartet
Sandy Winarta Trio
Sanur Jazz Project feat Damez Nababan
Sentimental Moods
Shadow Puppets feat Mike Mohede
Sierra Soetedjo Tribute to Bubi Chen
Sketsa
Sound of Soul Project
Storia
Suave
Taman Suropati Chamber
Tembang Pribumi
Teza Sumendra
The Hajar Bleh Big Band
The Jongens
The Newlans
Tohpati
Tomorrow People Ensemble
Trans Brothers Band
Tulus
Tuslah
Valera - Aartsen - Romero
YK Samarinda
YMI
Yuri Jo

2015
Date: March 6–8, 2015
Venue: Jakarta International Expo, Kemayoran

Lineup

Jessie J
Christina Perri
Chris Botti
Bobby McFerrin
Snarky Puppy
Lisa Ono
Kenny Lattimore
Kahitna
Naturally 7
Tulus
Sheila on 7
Meshell Ndegeocello
Reza Artamevia
Ramsey Lewis
Richard Bona
Harvey Mason
Mehliana (Brad Mehldau & Mark Guiliana)
Alain Caron
Chaka Khan featuring Incognito
Matajiwa
and many more

2016
Date: March 4–6, 2016
Venue: Jakarta International Expo, Kemayoran

Lineup

David Foster
Chris Botti featuring Sting
Robin Thicke
Kurt Elling
Tokyo Ska Paradise Orchestra
Seun Kuti & Egypt 80
Orquesta Buena Vista Social Club
Relish
Level 42
Candy Dulfer
Larry Coryell & David Garfield
Patti Austin
Hiatus Kaiyote
Till Brönner
Boney James
BadBadNotGood
Afgan
Barasuara
Marcell
Glenn Fredly
Raisa
Isyana Sarasvati
Michelle Walker
Mocca
Kunto Aji
Teza Sumendra
Yura Yunita
Sore
Tomorrow People Ensemble
Endah & Rhesa with Dialog Dini Hari
Maliq & D'Essentials
Rida Sita Dewi
Indro Hardjodikoro & Friends
and many more

2017
Date: March 3–5, 2017
Venue: Jakarta International Expo, Kemayoran

Lineup

Elliott Yamin
Incognito
Ne-Yo
Sergio Mendes
Naughty by Nature
Mezzoforte
Nik West
Bebel Gilberto
Tulus
Andien
Afgan
The Chick Corea Elektric Band
Arturo Sandoval
Anthony Strong
Wojtek Pilichowski
The Lao Tizer Band
Renegade Brass Band
Michael Martyniuk Quartet
Nicholas Payton Afro
Dira Sugandi
Lea Simanjuntak
Cristina Morrison
Blood Sweat Tears
and many more

2018
Date: March 2–4, 2018
Venue: Jakarta International Expo, Kemayoran

Friday, March 2

International artists lineup

Bernhoft and The Fashion Bruises
BJ the Chicago Kid
Chris Walker
Danish Radio Big Band
Dionne Warwick
DW3
Elan Trotman
Gorden Campbell
Harvey Mason
Ivan Lins
Jeff Lorber
Kennedy Administration
Kevin Randolph
Lee Ritenour
Marlon McClain
Mateus Asato with Rafi Muhammad Trio
Matthew Whitaker Trio
Maya Azucena
Maysa Leak and The Brian Simpson Band
Michael Manson
New York Voices
Papana Jazz Ensemble
Paul Jackson Jr.
Pianist Marvio Ciribelli and Brazilian Samba-Jazz Group
Ron King Big Band
The Commodores Experience feat. Thomas McClary
Vanessa Williams

Indonesian artists lineup

A Fine Tuning Creation
Adrian Adioetomo
Aksan Sjuman Trio
Bass G
BJ Dixieland
Classmate Journal
Dira Sugandi
Dwiki Dharmawan & Friends Feat.Trisouls and Rahmania Astrini
Elek Yo Band with Endah N Rhesa
Endah N Rhesa
Glenn Fredly
Hajarbleh Big Band
Indro Harjodikoro
Kunto Aji
Lara
Mery Kasiman
MLDJAZZPROJECT Season 2
NonaRia
Papua Original
Tesla Manaf
The Intersection
The Soulful Feat. Amelia Ong & Imela Kei
Tomorrow People Ensemble

Saturday, March 3

International artists lineup

Avery*Sunshine
Bernhoft and The Fashion Bruises
Chris Walker
Curtis Stigers
Daniel Caesar
Danish Radio Big Band
DW3
Elan Trotman
Gorden Campbell
Ivan Lins
Jeff Lorber
Kevin Randolph
Marlon McClain
Matthew Whitaker Trio
Maya Azucena
Maysa Leak and The Brian Simpson Band
Michael Manson
Neighbors Complain
New York Voices
Pianist Marvio Ciribelli and Brazilian Samba-Jazz Group
Ron King Big Band
The Commodores Experience ft. Thomas McClary
Tony Monaco

Indonesian artists lineup

70S OC
Candra Darusman Feat. Monita Tahalea, Teddy Adhitya, Danilla, Mondo Gascaro, Adikara Fardy, Nina Tamam, with Special Appearance from Chaisero and Karimata Trio
Devian Zikri
Dewa Budjana
Endah N Rhesa
Fourtwnty
Hiroaki Kato
JAKARTA BLUES FACTORY
Java Jive X Fariz RM
JAZ
Jordy Waelauruw
MLDJAZZPROJECT Feat. Marcel, Pusakata Danila, Syaharani
MLDJAZZPROJECT Season 1
Musicater - Cerita Fatmawati
Nayra Dharma
Petra Sihombing
Syaharani and Queenfireworks
Tashoora
The Daunas
Yamaha Music Project (Glenn Fredly, Andra Ramadhan, Tompi, Sandhy Sondoro, Kafin Sulthan)
Yura Yunita
ZIO

Sunday, March 4

International artists lineup

Avery*Sunshine
BJ the Chicago Kid
Danish Radio Big Band
DW3
Goo Goo Dolls
Incognito
Jhené Aiko
Kennedy Administration
Larry Carlton
Lauv
Maysa Leak and The Brian Simpson Band
Neighbors Complain
Pianist Marvio Ciribelli and Brazilian Samba-Jazz Group
The Urban Renewal Project

Indonesian artists lineup

Adhitia Sofyan
Adikara Fardy
Agam Hamzah & Arini Kumara
Andien
ANDRE Harihandoyo
Cakrawala
Deredia
Ècoutez
Fariz RM
Gerald Situmorang Dimensions
Gugun Blues Shelter with Tony Monaco
Idang Rasjidi
Indro Harjodikoro
Iramamama
Iwa K X Neurotic
Maliq & D'Essentials
Margie Segers Motown
MLDJAZZPROJECT Feat. Marcel, Pusakata Danila, Syaharani
MLDJUSTWANTED JUST ONE
Mondo Gascaro
Pusakata
Rega Dauna Project
Rendy Pandugo
Saxx in The City
Sheila and The Upmost
Teddy Adhitya
The Diplomats
The Rollies
Tohpati

2019
Date: March 1–3, 2019
Venue: Jakarta International Expo, Kemayoran

Line-up

Ade Avery
Afgan
Allen Hinds & L.A. Super Soul
Andien
Ardhito Pramono
Barry Likumahuwa Tribute to Roy Hargrove
Bob James Trio
Cyrus Chestnut Trio
The Daunas
Delia
Donny McCaslin
Elfa Zulham & The Beatz Messenger
Endah N Rhesa Extended
The Funky Knuckles
GoGo Penguin
Gretchen Parlato
Hanin Dhiya
H.E.R.
Idang Rasjidi & The Syndicate
Indra Aziz For Good
Indro Hardjodikoro
Isyana Sarasvati
James Vickery
Jeff Bernat
Jeslla
JMSN
John Beasley's MONK'estra
Kneebody
Knower
Kunto Aji
Louis Cole
Lucky Chops
Mac Ayres
Masego
Michal Martyniuk
MLDJazzProject
Moonchild
Nathan East: Band of Brothers
Nick Zavior
Nima Ilayla
Parkdrive
Peter White
R + R = NOW
Radhini
Raveena
Rendy Pandugo
Ron King Big Band
Saxx in the City
Sinéad Harnett
Sony Music Project featuring Jaz, Ardhito Pramono & Rendy Pandugo
Teddy Adhitya
The Soul Rebels
The Soulful
The Suffers
Tommy Pratomo
Tony Monaco Trio
Toto
Warner Music Project featuring Andini, Hanin Dhiya, Rahmania Astrini & Trisouls
Yura Yunita
Yuri Mahatma
ZAD
Zsolt Botos

2020
Date: February 28 – March 1, 2020
Venue: Jakarta International Expo, Kemayoran

Avrist Hall
Friday: Elfa Zulham Project, PREP, Ron King Big Band, Mateus Asato
Saturday: T-Square, Yura Yunita, Jeff Lorber Fusion Trio, Rini
Sunday: Yuka Tamada & Trio Wijaya, Mike Stern & Jeff Lorber Fusion Trio, Pamungkas, Ezra Collective

Be One Hall
Friday: Michael White, Maurice Brown, Michael Paulo & Gregg Karukas & Melissa Manchester
Saturday: ABBA Revival by Maya Hasan, Michael Paulo & Gregg Karukas & Melissa Manchester, Harvey Mason
Sunday: Zad, Jay Som, Brian Simpson & Jackiem Joyner, Young Gun Silver Fox

BNI Hall
Friday: Nusantero Big Band, Chrisye Live by Erwin Gutawa, Reza Artamevia
Saturday: Ardhito Pramono & Ron King Horn Section, Yuni Shara Jazz Project, The Jacksons
Sunday: 7 Bintang, BNI Music Project, Omar Apollo, Tulus

Brava Radio Hall by MRA Media
Friday: The Daunas, Tony Monaco & Friends, Christian Sands Trio, Gerald Situmorang & Sri Hanuraga "Meta"
Saturday: Mondo Gascaro & Rien Djamain, Idang Rasjidi Syndicate, Otti Jamalus & Yance Manusama, Asian Jazz All Stars
Sunday: Nita Aartsen Quintet, New York Voices, Tony Monaco & Friends, Sri Hanuraga Trio

Demajors Stage
Friday: Anov Blues One, Chiki Fawzi, Kabar Burung, 5 Petani, Beatluz Music Collective
Saturday: Skastra, The Melodrama, Alsa Project, Bubugiri, Amboro
Sunday: Shandya, Made Mawut, Adhitia Sofyan, Metta Legita, MRNMRS, D'Name Acoustic Project

Java Jazz Stage
Friday: Lalahuta, Anomalie, Keziah Jones, Marcell
Saturday: Lakateu Lian, Jay Som, Young Gun Silver Fox, Brass Against
Sunday: United States Air Force Band of the Pacific, Cosmo's Midnight, Humania, The Steve McQueens

Kementerian Pariwisata dan Ekonomi Kreatif Stage
Friday: Yongky Vincent, Ade Avery, Paulinho Garcia, Cantika, Oslo Ibrahim
Saturday: Faye Risakotta, Rebecca Reijman, Good Morning Everyone, Andezzz (Departure People)
Sunday: The Mighties, KRLY, Indro Hardjodikoro Project, Tommy Ivan & Uap Widya, Balawan Batuan Ethnic Fusion

MLD Spot Hall
Friday: Likumahuwa Jazz Connection, T-Square, The Free Nationals, Rini
Saturday: Andmesh, MLDJazzProject S4, Jaz, Prep
Sunday: Nania, Church (Mark de Clive-Lowe & Harvey Mason), MLDJazzProject All Stars, Brass Against

MLD Spot Stage Bus
Friday: The Good People, Bass G, Mawar de Jongh, Efek Rumah Kaca
Saturday: Dreikids, Barry Likumahuwa, Saxx in the City, Maliq & D'Essentials
Sunday: Tashoora, Tuan Tigabelas, Sal Priadi, Reality Club

Teh Botol Sosro Hall
Friday: Rizky Febian, Bruno Major, Phil Perry, Isyana Sarasvati
Saturday: Nusantero Big Band, New York Voices, Bruno Major, Kiana Ledé
Sunday: Janapati (Dewa Budjana & Tohpati), Phil Perry, Yamaha Music Project

Top Coffee Hall
Friday: Jopie Item & Friends, Jamie Aditya & Ron King Big Band, Marion Jola, Cory Henry & The Funk Apostles
Saturday: Paulinho Garcia & Elfa's Singers, Anomalie, Brian Simpson & Jackiem Joyner, Mateus Asato
Sunday: Benny Mustafa N Jongens & Margie Segers, Dwiki Dharmawan & Nadin Amizah, Ron King Big Band, Fariz RM Anthology

2021
Not held due to the COVID-19 pandemic

2022
Date: May 27–29, 2022
Venue: Jakarta International Expo, Kemayoran

References

External links

Java Festival Production

Jazz festivals in Indonesia
Music festivals established in 2005
Tourist attractions in Jakarta
2005 establishments in Indonesia
Annual events in Indonesia
Events in Jakarta